Hans Ledwinka (14 February 1878 – 2 March 1967) was an Austrian automobile designer.

Youth 
Ledwinka was born in Klosterneuburg (Lower Austria), near Vienna, then part of the Austro-Hungarian Empire.

He started his career as a mechanic, and later studied in Vienna. As a young man he worked for Nesselsdorfer-Wagenbau in Nesselsdorf, the company that later became Tatra in Moravia. He was first employed in the construction of railroad cars, and later involved in the production of the first cars made by this firm. He designed the 5.3-litre, six-cylinder Type U motor car. In the midst of World War I in May 1916 he accepted directorship at Steyr, initially working at home and moving there permanently in 1917.

Chief designer at Tatra 

Ledwinka returned to Tatra company (originally Nesselsdorfer-Wagenbau) in Kopřivnice (Nesselsdorf), then in Czechoslovakia, and between 1921 and 1937 he was their chief design engineer. He invented the frameless central tubular chassis (so-called "backbone chassis") with swing axles, fully independent suspension and rear-mounted air-cooled flat engine. Another of Ledwinka's major contributions to automobile design was the streamlined car body. Under him, Tatra brought the first mass-produced streamlined cars to market. With his son Erich, who became chief designer at Tatra, Ledwinka and Erich Übelacker, a German engineer also employed by Tatra, designed the streamlined Tatra models T77, T77a, T87, and T97, which had rear-mounted air-cooled engines.

Volkswagen controversy 

Both Adolf Hitler and Ferdinand Porsche were influenced by the Tatras. Hitler was a keen automotive enthusiast, and had ridden in Tatras during political tours of Czechoslovakia. He had also dined numerous times with Hans Ledwinka. After one of these dinners Hitler remarked to Porsche, "This is the car for my roads". While the book Car Wars, quotes Hitler as saying it was "the kind of car I want for my highways". In any case, of Ledwinka, Porsche admitted "Well, sometimes I looked over his shoulder and sometimes he looked over mine" while designing the Volkswagen Type 1. There is no doubt that the Type 1 bore a striking resemblance to the earlier Tatra. Tatra launched a lawsuit, but this was stopped when Germany invaded Czechoslovakia. At the same time, Tatra was forced to stop producing the T97. The matter was re-opened after World War II and in 1965 Volkswagen paid Tatra 1,000,000 Deutsche Marks in an out-of-court settlement.

Final years 
After WWII Ledwinka was accused of collaboration with the German occupation forces and jailed for five years in Czechoslovakia. After his release in 1951, he refused to work for Tatra, and retired to Munich, Germany where he died in 1967.

The legacy 

Ledwinka's son Erich, was also a car designer. He designed the unique Haflinger for Steyr-Daimler-Puch, as well as the larger Pinzgauer High Mobility All-Terrain Vehicle. Both utilize tubular chassis and swing portal axles.

See also
 Joseph Ledwinka
 Tatra

Notes

References 
Bibliography

External links
 http://www.aeiou.at/aeiou.encyclop.l/l358333.htm;internal&action=_setlanguage.action?LANGUAGE=en

1878 births
1967 deaths
People from Klosterneuburg
Austrian automobile designers
Austrian automotive pioneers
Czech automotive engineers
Tatra (company)
Grand Crosses with Star and Sash of the Order of Merit of the Federal Republic of Germany